The men's floor exercise was a gymnastics event contested as part of the Gymnastics at the 1964 Summer Olympics programme at the Tokyo Metropolitan Gymnasium.

Medalists

Results

Preliminary

Each gymnast competed in both compulsory and optional exercises, with the median scores from the four judges for the two sets of exercises were summed.  This score was also used in calculating both individual all-around and team scores.

The top 6 advanced to the final for the apparatus, keeping half of their preliminary score to be added to their final score.

Final

References

Sources
 

Gymnastics at the 1964 Summer Olympics
Men's events at the 1964 Summer Olympics